The acetabular fossa is a fossa located at the centre of the acetabulum. It is occupied by the ligament of head of femur.

In contrast to the thick and smooth surrounding lunate surface, the pelvis' articulation with the head of the femur, the acetabular fossa is rough and thin, often transparent, and continuous with the acetabular notch below.

Additional Images

References

Pelvis